Braemeadows is a rural locality in the Shire of Hinchinbrook, Queensland, Australia. In the  Braemeadows had a population of 290 people.

History 
Braemeadows State School opened on 1928 and closed on 1969.

In the  Braemeadows had a population of 290 people.

References 

Shire of Hinchinbrook
Localities in Queensland